Madisonville is a city in Madison County, Texas, United States. The population was 4,420 at the 2020 census. It is the county seat of Madison County. Both the City of Madisonville and the County of Madison were named for U.S. President James Madison, the fourth chief executive.

Geography

Madisonville is located at  (30.950915, –95.912623).

Demographics

As of the 2020 United States census, there were 4,420 people, 1,548 households, and 1,065 families residing in the city.

At the 2000 census there were 4,159 people, 1,473 households, and 1,016 families living in the city. The population density was 1,003.3 people per square mile (386.9/km). There were 1,653 housing units at an average density of 398.7 per square mile (153.8/km).  The racial makeup of the city was 56.60% White, 29.21% African American, 0.50% Native American, 0.41% Asian, 0.02% Pacific Islander, 10.56% from other races, and 2.69% from two or more races. Hispanic or Latino of any race were 22.24%.

Of the 1,473 households 35.6% had children under the age of 18 living with them, 46.1% were married couples living together, 17.7% had a female householder with no husband present, and 31.0% were non-families. 26.8% of households were one person and 13.2% were one person aged 65 or older. The average household size was 2.70 and the average family size was 3.28.

The age distribution was 29.7% under the age of 18, 10.1% from 18 to 24, 25.2% from 25 to 44, 18.2% from 45 to 64, and 16.8% 65 or older. The median age was 33 years. For every 100 females, there were 88.7 males. For every 100 females age 18 and over, there were 82.3 males.

The median household income was $25,440 and the median family income  was $29,077. Males had a median income of $22,292 versus $19,885 for females. The per capita income for the city was $12,551. About 20.7% of families and 23.2% of the population were below the poverty line, including 31.1% of those under age 18 and 17.0% of those age 65 or over.

Education
The City of Madisonville is served by the Madisonville Consolidated Independent School District.

Climate
The climate in this area is characterized by hot, humid summers and generally mild to cool winters.  According to the Köppen Climate Classification system, Madisonville has a humid subtropical climate, abbreviated "Cfa" on climate maps.

History 
The town of Madisonville was founded in 1853 as the county seat of the at the time newly organized Madison county. Lots were sold in the summer of the same year, on a 200 acre tract of land donated by Job Starks Collard. At the suggestion of Dr. Pleasant Williams Kittrell, the town was named after President James Madison.

Gallery

References

External links

 City of Madisonville
 History of Madisonville from the Handbook of Texas Online published by the Texas State Historical Association

Cities in Texas
Cities in Madison County, Texas
County seats in Texas